Dóra Papp (born 5 January 1991 in Szombathely) is a Hungarian football midfielder currently playing in the Eredivisie for VV Alkmaar. She is a member of the Hungarian national team.

References

1991 births
Living people
Hungarian women's footballers
Hungary women's international footballers
Viktória FC-Szombathely players
MTK Hungária FC (women) players
Women's association football midfielders
Sportspeople from Szombathely